In South Africa, the driving licence is the official document which authorises the holder to drive a motor vehicle on a public road. Driving licences are issued by authorised driving licence testing centres, which are run by the municipalities under the supervision of the provincial and national Departments of Transport. Since 1998, the driving licence has been issued in a "credit card format"; before then it was included in the holder's national identity document. The minimum age to hold a licence is 18. Apply for a driving licence  South African  with the exception of Code A1 for which the minimum age is 16.

Licence codes
Driving licences are issued with various codes that indicate the types of vehicle that may be driven with that licence; the codes are shown in the following table.

Renewal of driver's licence 
Before applying for a driving licence, a prospective driver must first obtain a learner's licence. The learner's test is a multiple-choice test that examines knowledge of vehicle controls, rules of the road, and traffic signs.

The following criteria required:

 Rules of the road – There are 28 questions in this category with 22 being the pass mark
 Vehicle controls – There are 8 questions in this section, the required pass mark is 6
 Road signs, road markings and traffic signals – There are 28 questions in this category with a pass mark of 23

Three types of learner's licence are issued:
 Code 1: motorcycles.
 Code 2: vehicles (except motorcycles) with tare weight of 3,500 kilograms or less; minibuses, buses and goods vehicles with GVM of 3,500 kg or less; and articulated vehicles with GCM of 3,500 kg or less.
 Code 3: all vehicles (except motorcycles).

The minimum age for a Code 1 or 2 licence is 17, and for a Code 3 licence it is 18. At the age of 16 a Code 1 licence limited to motorcycles with engine capacity under 125 cc may be obtained. Learner's licences are valid for 24 months, and, except for Code 1 licences, require that the learner be accompanied by a fully licensed driver. It is not compulsory for a learner driver to have a big red "L" on the rear window, but it is recommended so that other drivers can have patience with the driver.   

With the learner's licence, the prospective driver can take a driving test to obtain their driving licence. The driving test has two components: the first is the yard test, in which the applicant demonstrates various parking and turning manoeuvres in a specially constructed parking lot. If the yard test is successful, it is followed by the road test, in which the applicant demonstrates their driving ability on the public roads, following the instructions of the examiner.

Some errors on the test, such as a collision, speeding, or rolling in an unintended direction (this can be forwards or backwards) when moving off, will cause an instant failure of the test. Other errors cause the driver to lose points; if too many points are lost, this will also cause failure. If the applicant is successful, they will be issued with a paper Temporary Driving Licence, which is valid for 6 months from the date of issue. A permanent card licence will be available for collection at the testing station the applicant went to for the driving test within 4–6 weeks. Motorists are recommended to apply for their licence using the online NATIS services.

References

South Africa
Road transport in South Africa